Ayliffe  is an English surname. Notable people with this surname include:

John Ayliffe (1676–1732), English jurist expelled from Oxford University
Royce Ayliffe, Australian professional Rugby League footballer
Thomas Hamilton Ayliffe (1774–1852) and family, early settlers of South Australia
Sir John Ayliffe, physician to Henry VIII and in the group painting by Hans Holbein the younger